

East Vernon Light is an active lighthouse in the Northern Territory of Australia located in the Clarence Strait on the southern coast of East Vernon Island. The lighthouse guards the northeastern approach to Darwin.

History
The original lighthouse was constructed by the Commonwealth Lighthouse Service during the "Golden Age of Australian Lighthouses", between 1913 and 1920. The current red lighthouse was built on the same piles.

The light characteristic shown is a flash every five seconds, with a different color depending on the direction: white on 250°-042° and -094°, red on -088° and green on -105°. The light is obscured
elsewhere (Fl.W.R.G. 5s).

The site is accessible by boat and the tower is closed to the public. The light is operated by the Australian Maritime Safety Authority.

See also

 List of lighthouses in Australia

Notes

References

 
 
  reprinted in 
 

Lighthouses completed in the 20th century
Lighthouses in the Northern Territory